In enzymology, a sucrose-1,6-alpha-glucan 3(6)-alpha-glucosyltransferase is an enzyme that catalyzes the chemical reaction

sucrose + (1,6-alpha-D-glucosyl)n  D-fructose + (1,6-alpha-D-glucosyl)n+1

Thus, the two substrates of this enzyme are sucrose and (1,6-alpha-D-glucosyl)n, whereas its two products are D-fructose and (1,6-alpha-D-glucosyl)n+1.

This enzyme belongs to the family of glycosyltransferases, specifically the hexosyltransferases.  The systematic name of this enzyme class is sucrose:1,6-alpha-D-glucan 3(6)-alpha-D-glucosyltransferase. Other names in common use include water-soluble-glucan synthase, GTF-S, sucrose-1,6-alpha-glucan 3(6)-alpha-glucosyltransferase, sucrose:1,6-alpha-D-glucan 3-alpha- and 6-alpha-glucosyltransferase, sucrose:1,6-, 1,3-alpha-D-glucan 3-alpha- and, and 6-alpha-D-glucosyltransferase.

References

 
 
 

EC 2.4.1
Enzymes of unknown structure